Agathi "Agi" Kassoumi (born 13 July 1966) is a Greek pistol shooter who has competed at six Olympic Games between 1984 and 2004. Her best position was 11th in the 25 metre pistol at the 1992 Olympics.

She is the second Greek, after sailor Anastasios Bountouris, to compete at six Olympic Games.

See also
List of athletes with the most appearances at Olympic Games

References

External links
 

1966 births
Living people
Greek female sport shooters
ISSF pistol shooters
Olympic shooters of Greece
Shooters at the 1984 Summer Olympics
Shooters at the 1988 Summer Olympics
Shooters at the 1992 Summer Olympics
Shooters at the 1996 Summer Olympics
Shooters at the 2000 Summer Olympics
Shooters at the 2004 Summer Olympics
Mediterranean Games silver medalists for Greece
Competitors at the 2013 Mediterranean Games
Mediterranean Games medalists in shooting
Sportspeople from Athens
20th-century Greek women
21st-century Greek women